The Kuwaiti national ice hockey team is the national men's ice hockey team of Kuwait. The team is controlled by the Kuwait Ice Hockey Association and has been an associate member of the International Ice Hockey Federation (IIHF). Kuwait has played in the Challenge Cup of Asia, a regional tournament for lower-tier hockey nations in Asia. They made their debut at the 2018 World Championship Division III Qualification tournament.

History
In 1985, Kuwait joined the IIHF, and were expelled in 1992 due to lack of activity. In 1999, Kuwait rejoined the IIHF and played their first games at the 1999 Asian Winter Games against Japan, China, and Mongolia, losing all three. In 2007, they returned to international play at the 2007 Asian Winter Games where they recorded their first win against Macau. The following year they competed in the Arab Cup finishing second after losing to the United Arab Emirates in the final. In 2010, Kuwait competed in their first Challenge Cup of Asia, finishing seventh overall, and in 2014, finishing 6th overall, losing all five games, and were relegated to Division I. Also they participated in the Kuwaiti organized Gulf Championship, finishing second behind the United Arab Emirates.

Tournament record

World Championships

Asian Winter Games

Arab Cup/GCC Gulf Championship

Challenge Cup of Asia

All-time record against other nations
As of 08 March 2022

References

External links

IIHF profile

National ice hockey teams in Asia
National ice hockey teams in the Arab world
Ice hockey
Ice hockey in Kuwait